Wayne Heffley (July 15, 1927 – November 19, 2008) was an American television and film actor, known for the role of Vern Scofield on Days of Our Lives, as well as over 100 other roles. He died of kidney failure in 2008.

He was guitarist Jason Becker's maternal grandfather.

Filmography

References

External links
 

American male film actors
American male soap opera actors
American male television actors
Male actors from Bakersfield, California
1927 births
2008 deaths
20th-century American male actors
21st-century American male actors
Deaths from kidney failure